Richard J. T. Calland (born 10 July, 1964) is a British-South African writer and political analyst. Calland is Associate Professor of Public Law at the University of Cape Town and a Fellow of the Cambridge Institute for Sustainability Leadership. He is a co-Director of Sustainability Education and has been a columnist for the Mail & Guardian since 2001.

Biography

Education
Calland read Law at Durham University (Hatfield College) and was called to the bar at Lincoln's Inn in 1987. Apart from his undergraduate degree he holds an LLM from the University of Cape Town and a postgraduate diploma in World Politics from the London School of Economics.

Career
Calland practiced as a barrister in London until 1994, when he moved to South Africa to work as an advisor to the ANC in the Western Cape before the upcoming election.

From 1995 to 2011 he headed the Political Monitoring & Information Service at IDASA. In 2005 he was a visiting scholar at the Lauterpacht Centre for International Law at Cambridge University. Other than democratic governance, his academic interests include sustainable development and climate finance. He is the author of several books on the Politics of South Africa, among them, The Zuma Years: South Africa's Changing Face of Power, published in 2013.

Views
Commenting to the Chicago Tribune in 1999, he compared the charisma and charm of Nelson Mandela to Ronald Reagan. He has been critical of the proposal made by Thuli Madonsela that public servants implicated in corruption should be given the chance to apply for amnesty.

References

1964 births
Living people
British emigrants to South Africa
British legal scholars
Alumni of Hatfield College, Durham
Alumni of the London School of Economics
South African columnists
South African people of British descent
University of Cape Town alumni